The Miwok (also spelled Miwuk, Mi-Wuk, or Me-Wuk) are members of four linguistically related Native American groups indigenous to what is now Northern California, who traditionally spoke one of the Miwok languages in the Utian family. The word Miwok means people in the Miwok languages.

Subgroups

Anthropologists commonly divide the Miwok into four geographically and culturally diverse ethnic subgroups.  These distinctions were not used among the Miwok before European contact.
Plains and Sierra Miwok: from the western slope and foothills of the Sierra Nevada, the Sacramento Valley, San Joaquin Valley and the Sacramento-San Joaquin Delta
Coast Miwok: from present day location of Marin County and southern Sonoma County (includes the Bodega Bay Miwok and Marin Miwok)
Lake Miwok: from Clear Lake basin of Lake County
Bay Miwok: from present-day location of Contra Costa County

Federally recognized tribes

The United States Bureau of Indian Affairs officially recognizes eleven tribes of Miwok descent in California. They are as follows:
 Buena Vista Rancheria of Me-Wuk Indians
 California Valley Miwok Tribe, formerly known as the Sheep Ranch Rancheria of Me-Wuk Indians 
 Chicken Ranch Rancheria of Me-Wuk Indians
 Federated Indians of Graton Rancheria, formerly known as the Federated Coast Miwok
 Ione Band of Miwok Indians, of Ione, California
 Jackson Rancheria of Me-Wuk Indians
 Middletown Rancheria (members of this tribe are of Pomo, Lake Miwok, and Wintun descent)
 Shingle Springs Band of Miwok Indians, Shingle Springs Rancheria (Verona Tract)
 Tuolumne Band of Me-Wuk Indians of the Tuolumne Rancheria
 United Auburn Indian Community of Auburn Rancheria
 Wilton Rancheria Indian Tribe

Non-federally recognized tribes

 Miwok Tribe of the El Dorado Rancheria
 Nashville-Eldorado Miwok Tribe
 Colfax-Todds Valley Consolidated Tribe of the Colfax Rancheria
 Southern Sierra Miwuk Nation
 Calaveras Band of Mi-Wuk Indians
 Miwok of Buena Vista Rancheria
 River Valley Miwok Indians,  formally known as Historical Families of Wilton Rancheria

History

The predominant theory regarding the settlement of the Americas date the original migrations from Asia to around 20,000 years ago across the Bering Strait land bridge, but anthropologist Otto von Sadovszky claims that the Miwok and some other northern California tribes descend from Siberians who arrived in California by sea around 3,000 years ago.

Culture

The Miwok lived in small bands without centralized political authority before contact with European Americans in 1769.  They had domesticated dogs and cultivated tobacco, but were otherwise hunter-gatherers.

Cuisine
The Sierra Miwok harvested acorns from the California Black Oak. In fact, the modern-day extent of the California Black Oak forests in some areas of Yosemite National Park is partially due to cultivation by Miwok tribes. They burned understory vegetation to reduce the fraction of Ponderosa Pine.  Nearly every other kind of edible vegetable matter was used as a food source, including bulbs, seeds, and fungi.  Animals were hunted with arrows, clubs or snares, depending on the species and the situation.  Grasshoppers were a highly prized food source, as were mussels for those groups adjacent to the Stanislaus River.  Coastal Miwok were known to have predominantly relied on food gathered from the inland side of the Marin peninsula (modern San Pablo bay, lakes, and land based foods), but to have also engaged in diving for abalone in the Pacific Ocean.

The Miwok ate meals according to appetite rather than at regular times.  They stored food for later consumption, primarily in flat-bottomed baskets.

Religion
The Miwok creation story and narratives tend to be similar to those of other natives of Northern California. Miwok had totem animals, identified with one of two moieties, which were in turn associated respectively with land and water.  These totem animals were not thought of as literal ancestors of humans, but rather as predecessors.

Languages

Sports
Miwok people played mixed-gender games on a  playing field called poscoi a we'a. A unique game was played with young men and women. Similarly to soccer, the object was to put an elk hide ball through the goalpost. The girls were allowed to do anything, including kicking the ball and picking it up and running with it. The boys were only allowed to use their feet, but if a girl was holding it he could pick her up and carry her towards his goal.

Population
In 1770, there were an estimated 500 Lake Miwok, 1,500 Coast Miwok, and 9,000 Plains and Sierra Miwok, totaling about 11,000 people, according to historian Alfred L. Kroeber, although this may be a serious undercount; for example, he did not identify the Bay Miwok. The 1910 Census reported only 671 Miwok total, and the 1930 Census, 491. See history of each Miwok group for more information.  Today there are about 3,500 Miwok in total.

Influences on popular culture
The Star Wars films feature a fictional species of forest-dwelling creatures known as Ewoks, who are ostensibly named after the Miwok. 

The Miwok people are encountered in Kim Stanley Robinson's book, The Years of Rice and Salt. In an alternate history scenario depicted in the book they are the first group of Native Americans encountered by the first Chinese to discover the continent.

See also
Kule Loklo
Saklan
Lucy Telles
Utian languages

Notes

References
 Access Genealogy: Indian Tribal records, Miwok Indian Tribe. Retrieved on 2006-08-01. Main source of "authenticated village" names and locations.
 Barrett, S.A. and Gifford, E.W. Miwok Material Culture: Indian Life of the Yosemite Region. Yosemite Association, Yosemite National Park, California, 1933. 
 Cook, Sherburne. The Conflict Between the California Indian and White Civilization. Berkeley and Los Angeles, CA: University of California Press, 1976. .
 Kroeber, Alfred L. 1925. Handbook of the Indians of California. Washington, D.C: Bureau of American Ethnology Bulletin No. 78. (Chapter 30, The Miwok); available at Yosemite Online Library.
 Silliman, Stephen. Lost Laborers in Colonial California, Native Americans and the Archaeology of Rancho Petaluma. Tucson, AZ: University of Arizona Press, 2004. .
 Miwok Bibliography

External links 

 California Historical Society:The First Californians, The Miwok
 Native Tribes, Groups, Language Families and Dialects of California in 1770 (map after Kroeber)
 Tribe information from Angel Island State Park
 U.S. Bureau of Indian Affairs
Short radio episode Mouse Steals Fire from Coast Miwok lore in Californian Indian Nights Entertainments, 1930, California Legacy Projec.
 Mewuktribe.com

 
Native American tribes in California
Sierra Nevada (United States)
Central Valley (California)
History of the San Francisco Bay Area